Indesit Company was an Italian company based in Fabriano, Ancona. It was one of the leading European manufacturers and distributors of major domestic appliances (washing machines, dryers, dishwashers, fridges, freezers, cookers, hoods, ovens and hobs). It claims to be the undisputed leader in major markets such as Italy, the UK and Russia. Founded in 1975 and listed on the Milan stock exchange since 1987, the group posted sales of €2.7 billion in 2013. It has eight industrial areas in Italy, Poland, the UK, Russia and Turkey, and 16,000 employees.

History
The company was founded in 1975 as Merloni Elettrodomestici SpA by Vittorio Merloni as a spin-off from Industrie Merloni.

In the 1980s, with other Italian companies having been taken over by foreign appliance manufacturers, Merloni became the premier domestic producer in the industry. From 1981 the company went through a period of crisis, which ended in 1984, when Vittorio Merloni, having concluded his presidency of Confindustria, returned to managing Indesit. Profits and revenues of the company grew, and this led the Merloni family to decide in 1986 in favor of the company's entry into the stock market.

In 1987, Merloni Elettrodomestici, already listed on the stock exchange, acquired Indesit (founded in Torino as Industria Elettrodomestici Spirea Italia SpA, a subsidiary of Spirea srl, by Armando Campioni, Adelchi Candellero and Filippo Gatta in 1953), its biggest rival on the Italian market which also had a certain international presence, as well as 33% of Philco Italy. In 2005, Merloni Elettrodomestici was renamed Indesit Company S.p.A.

In 1988, Merloni, under the Ariston and Indesit brands, had a turnover of USD1.059 billion, becoming the fourth largest European manufacturer of home appliances. The following year, it acquired and absorbed the French company Scholtès.

In 1990, Merloni capital entered Marcegaglia, its supplier of steel tubes, which detected 7% of the shares. In the same year the company had approximately 6,000 employees in various establishments including France, Portugal and Russia.

In 1994, Merloni had a turnover of 1,920 billion lire with a market share of 10% in Europe. The following year took over one third of the capital of Star S.p.A. (Società Trevigiana Apparecchi Riscaldamento), an Italian company of Conegliano Veneto producer of kitchen hoods, which will be fully acquired in 2002 and merged with the Company in 2003.

In 1999, through Fineldo, the holding of Merloni family, acquired Panini, manufacturer of collectible stickers.

In 2000, Indesit took over the entire capital of Philco and acquired Stinol, the first Russian producer of household appliances.

In 2001, Indesit was bought by the British company Hotpoint for £121m.

The company of Fabriano in 2002 entered the consumer electronics industry with the purchase of Sinudyne.

In 2005, Indesit Company closes its French industrial site in Thionville. In February 2005, Merloni Elettrodomestici was renamed Indesit Company: Indesit is the best known of the Group's brands outside Italy.

At the beginning of 2007, Indesit Company launched the group's new brand architecture, Hotpoint, and combined with Ariston to form the Hotpoint-Ariston brand.

On 31 July 2009 the Indesit closed its plant at Kinmel Park, Bodelwyddan Denbighshire, Wales, UK due to a "continuing decline" in the market.  The factory employed 305 workers.

Andrea Merloni, from 2010, succeeded his father Vittorio to lead the company as the new chairman. On 9 June 2010, the company announced an investment of 120 million over the three-year period 2010–2012 to consolidate its presence in Italy and simultaneously the closure of the two plants Brembate (Bergamo) and Refrontolo (Treviso).

In May 2011, the company signed sponsorship deals with Arsenal Football Club, of London.

In October 2012, Indesit signed a supply agreement with Waterlogic for advanced water purification devices. The agreement was valid until 2015. In 2012 Indesit Company announced its entry into the Small Domestic Appliances market.

In 2013, with reference to the year 2012, the maximum A+ application level was reached in the Sustainability Report.

In May 2013 Marco Milani was appointed Chairman of the group, maintaining simultaneously the role of CEO.

In 2014, Whirlpool Corporation agreed to pay 758 million euros to buy a 60% stake in Indesit and its owner Hotpoint, which was a market leader in Italy, the United Kingdom and Russia, from the Merloni family to further expand outside its U.S. home market.

In 2017, police investigation pointed to an Indesit made Hotpoint fridge freezer, model FF175BP of 2006-2009 (discontinued since then), caused the Grenfell Tower fire

The figures 

Indesit posted sales of €2.9 billion in 2012. 
Indesit Company has eight production sites, of which three are in Italy (Fabriano, Comunanza and Caserta), and five are abroad (two in Poland, one in the UK, one in Russia and one in Turkey) counting 16 thousand employees.

Brands
 Indesit
 Hotpoint-Ariston
 Scholtès
 Stinol
 Termogamma
 Ariston (formerly, merged with Hotpoint)

See also 

 Ariston Thermo
 Hotpoint
 Aristide Merloni
 Francesco Merloni
 Vittorio Merloni

References

External links
Indesit corporate website
Indesit
Indesit Australia  
Hotpoint-Ariston 
Scholtès
Borsa Italiana
Google – Finance

 
Home appliance brands
Home appliance manufacturers of Italy
Whirlpool Corporation brands
2014 mergers and acquisitions
Companies based in le Marche
Manufacturing companies of Italy
Manufacturing companies established in 1975
Italian brands
Multinational companies headquartered in Italy
Companies listed on the Borsa Italiana
Italian companies established in 1975